San Escobar is a non-existent country, created by a blunder from the Polish Minister of Foreign Affairs Witold Waszczykowski.

On 10 January 2017, Waszczykowski told reporters that, in a bid for a non-permanent seat for Poland on the UN Security Council, he had meetings with officials from various countries, including some Caribbean nations, with some of them "perhaps for the first time in the history of our diplomacy. For example with countries such as San Escobar or  Belize".

Internet phenomenon

A governmental spokeswoman said it had been a slip of the tongue for "San Cristóbal y Nieves", which is Spanish for Saint Kitts and Nevis. News about San Escobar swept over numerous media outlets all over the world.

As a result, the country gained a significant presence on the Internet, and was spontaneously given a fictitious identity on social media (Twitter, Facebook), including a flag (blue, white, and green stripes, with a yellow 5-pointed star in a red triangle), photos and maps. The Facebook page was created by Jarek Kubicki, a member of the Razem political party. Within a day the hashtag #SanEscobar was tracked by over 2 million people and has become the most popular within the Polish segment of Twitter. San Escobar has also become a subject of numerous joke news, e.g. about an appointment of a military attaché and its nice ecology. A good deal of them play upon drug lord Pablo Escobar, popularized via the TV series Narcos.

A Twitter account for 'República Popular Democrática de San Escobar' was established, which quickly rose to prominence. It announced full support for Waszczykowski in his endeavor, and proceeded to issuing various news releases in Spanish and English, including a reproach towards Saint Kitts and Nevis: the correction of the Polish spokeswoman was interpreted as an attempt to foil Poland—San Escobar relations. San Escobar issues a newspaper, San Escobar Times (also on Twitter). San Escobar has also become a popular travel destination via El Niño Airlines. For a while the phrase "Maybe I better drop it all and fly to San Escobar?" has become very popular (Polish: „A może rzucić to wszystko i polecieć do San Escobar?”, a play with the Polish saying "A może rzucić to wszystko i wyjechać w Bieszczady"). Ticketing service Fru wrote that there are only one-way tickets to San Escobar. Netflix (the creator of Narcos) also allegedly claimed it already has airline tickets to sell. For a while Wikipedia had a full-blown article about the country, including its population count, capital city (Santo Subito), and all. Other accounts were soon created for political and other entities within San Escobar, like one for 'El Frente Comunista de San Escobar' (The Communist Front of San Escobar), which leads a guerrilla war against the fictional country's government.

Waszczykowski quickly became a target of all kinds of derision. For example, a newspaper published suggestions of other countries for Waszczykowski to consider, such as San Serriffe or various micronations.

On January 20, 2017 Comedy Central Poland recorded an anthem of San Escobar sung by Eric Cartman, an animated South Park character.

In 2017 Waszczykowski has won the Polskie Radio Program III listener's poll "" for the most surprising or funniest utterance by a Polish public person. While receiving the award, Waszczykowski commented: "I'd rather expect the note of recognition from the Geographical Society. It did not arrive."

The phenomenon of San Escobar became a subject of a scholarly paper.

See also

 List of fictional countries
 Listenbourg

References

External links 

 San Escobar on Twitter
 Map of San Escobar

Fictional countries in the Americas
Internet memes introduced in 2017
Internet humor
Politics of Poland
2017 in Poland
Foreign relations of Saint Kitts and Nevis
Poland and the United Nations
Fictional island countries
Political Internet memes